Mabalacat, officially the City of Mabalacat, is a 3rd class component city in the province of Pampanga, Philippines. According to the 2020 census, it has a population of 293,244 people.

Etymology
The town's name was derived from indigenous Negrito word mabalacat meaning "forest of balacats".

Geography 

The soil is charcoal black and shiny, a sign of fertility, and is suitable for growing rice, sugarcane and other rootcrops. Like the neighbouring cities of Angeles and San Fernando and the towns/municipalities of Porac, Bacolor, Santa Rita, Mexico, Magalang and Arayat, this city rarely gets inundated by floods from heavy rains and typhoons because it is situated on an elevated, well-drained part of the Central Luzon plains known as the "Upper Pampanga".

Barangays
Mabalacat is politically subdivided into 27 barangays.

 Atlu-Bola (PB: Kap. Benjamin Pangan)
 Bical (PB: Kap. Rolando Liwanang
 Bundagul (PB: Kap. Manny Tolentino)
 Cacutud (PB: Kap. Arnold Reyes)
 Calumpang (PB: Kap. Armando Yalung)
 Camachiles (PB: Kap. Edgar Garcia)
 Dapdap (including Madapdap Resettlement) (PB: Kap. Javier Taruc)
 Dau (PB: Kap. Derrick Llanos Dee)
 Dolores (PB: Kap. Jerry Tanglao)
 Duquit (PB: Kap. Irene Villanueva)
 Lakandula (PB: Kap. Fernando De Guzman)
 Mabiga (PB: Kap. Elmer Calaguas)
 Macapagal Village (PB: Kap. Lamberto Dizon)
 Mamatitang (PB: Kap. Jayson Viray)
 Mangalit (PB: Kap. Fernando Maglalang)
 Marcos Village (PB: Kap. Archiebon Estanislao)
 Mawaque (Mauaque) (PB: Kap. Noel Dimarucut)
 Paralayunan (PB: Kap. Rey Pineda)
 Poblacion (PB: Kap. Elmer Mendiola)
 San Francisco (PB: Kap. Robert Layson)
 San Joaquin (PB: Kap. Davidson David)
 Santa Ines (PB: Kap. Noel Sicat)
 Santa Maria (PB: Kap. Enrico Espino)
 Santo Rosario (PB: Kap. Jomer Ong)
 Sapang Balen (PB: Kap. Gener Lagman)
 Sapang Biabas (PB: Kap. Soraida Cabuang)
 Tabun (PB: Kap. Danilo De Leon)

The largest barangay is Dau, which became a barrio in 1936 by virtue of Presidential Proclamation No. 1. It is now a business center whose commercial output runs parallel to that of downtown. A former terminus of the North Luzon Expressway, it is the most urban and most populous area in Mabalacat, home to roughly 23% of the city's population.

San Francisco, the second largest barangay, along with San Joaquin, Santa Ines, Poblacion, Calumpang and other barangays are categorized as urban in view of their proximity to the city proper. Sapang Balen, with a population of 166 persons, is the smallest barangay.

Climate

History
Prior to 1712, Mabalacat was a barrio (barangay) of Bambang, now Bamban, Tarlac. It became a town in 1792, and was named after the abundant Balacat tree (Ziziphus talanai), a fourth class timber tree with bark that possess antimicrobial properties. Once a settlement of an Aeta tribe, the area was a virtual forest of balacat trees. "Ma-balacat" in the native Kapampangan language means "full of Balacats." Mabalacat in Maranao is "Mababaapalaqat" (Palacat), which means "maiksing hagdan" in Tagalog.

In 1853 Mabalacat had a population of 2,611 and four barangays, namely, Babangdapu, Duquit, Malabni, and Paglimbunan. By 1903 its population increased to 7,049 in 19 barangays. These were Bical, Bundagul, Dapdap, Dau, Dolores, Iba, Mabiga, Mamatitang, Mangalit, Matas, Mawaque, Paralayunan, Poblacion, Quitangil (later renamed to San Francisco), San Joaquin, Santa Ines, Santa Maria, Sapang Balen, and Sapang Biabas. In 1948, Mabalacat's barangays increased to 20 with the addition of Fort Stotsenburg.

In 1860 a military command was established by authorities of the Spanish Governor-General due to the lawlessness and depredations perpetrated by the negritos (Aetas, or derogatorily called balugas). The Pampanga towns of Bamban, Capas, Concepcion, Victoria, Tarlac, Magalang, Porac, and Floridablanca and Mabalacat were created into what was called a Commandancia Militar. However, in 1873 the Military Command returned Mabalacat together with the towns of Magalang, Floridablanca, and Porac to the parent province, Pampanga.

Cityhood

The former municipality was officially upgraded to a city following a referendum on July 21, 2012, and became the third in Pampanga after Angeles City and San Fernando. It is home to roughly most of the Clark Freeport Zone, the rest in nearby Angeles, where the main gate is located. Clark International Airport, as well as the numerous hotels, casinos, golf courses, and resorts in Clark Freeport, are mostly situated in Mabalacat.

Demographics

Economy 
In 1997, there were 2,447 business establishments registered in the Mabalacat City, consisting of 79 manufacturers mostly involved in sash factory, iron works, ceramics, bakery and 1,806 trading companies. The financial needs are served by eleven banks, mostly concentrated in Dau.

Public utilities include the Mabalacat Water System, Pampanga Electric Corporation II (PELCO II), three telephone companies namely, Datelcom Corporation (DATELCOM), Smart Communications (SMART) and Digital Telecommunications Philippines, Incorporated (DIGITEL) and one cable television network (PRO-SAT) which runs solely for Mabalacat.

The city is also a major transportation hub; a number of major road networks including the North Luzon Expressway, Subic–Clark–Tarlac Expressway, and MacArthur Highway cut across the region. At the southern part of the city is the Dau Bus Terminal, which caters to passengers bound for Metro Manila and provinces in Northern Luzon such as Tarlac, Pangasinan, Ilocos Norte, Ilocos Sur, Nueva Ecija, La Union, Bataan, and Zambales.

Government
Mabalacat City Government is composed of a Mayor as a Chief Executive and Sangguniang Panlungsod headed by the City Vice Mayor and 10 Sangguniang Panlungsod members with 3 ex-officio.

The following are the elected officials of Mabalacat City who assumed office on the noon of June 30, 2022 (except for the Ex-Officio members)

Mayor 
Crisostomo C. Garbo (NPC)

Vice-Mayor 
Atty. Gerald Guttrie P. Aquino (NPC)

Sangguniang Panlungsod 

 Marcos Castro Jr. (NPC)
 Cherry Manalo (NPC)
 Timothy Paul Dee (NPC)
 Marjorie Grace Sambo (NPC)
 Dr. Victor Tiglao III (NPC)
 Noelito Castro (NPC)
 Elizabeth Pineda (NPC)
 Roland Peña (NPC)
 Jerry Magsino (NPC)
 Francis Carlo Dizon (NPC)

Ex-Officio Members:

 ABC President Elmer Mendiola (Non-Partisan)
 SK President Hans Christian Balingit (Non-Partisan)
 Ruvielline Margarito (Non-Partisan)

City Fiesta 

Legend tells us that when the early settlers were clearing the forests, Cabezang Laureana's workers found, hidden among the bushes, a statue of the Blessed Virgin Mary with baby Jesus sitting on her lap. On February 2, the statue was presented by Caragan as a gift to Padre Maximo Manuguid, the priest of the early Mabalacat Church that was made of sawali and cogon grass. From then on, the city fiesta was observed on the second of February.

Pastorella 
The pastorella (Misa de Pastores in honor of the shepherds at the birth of Jesus Christ - a set of Latin hymns of the 9-day Christmas Masses) ceased in Pampanga towns for 40 years after Vatican II.

In Mabalacat, however, at Our Lady of Divine Grace Parish and San Rafael Arkanghel Parish, pastorella lives on: In the 4:30 a.m. mass on Monday, the pastorella repertoire includes the Kyrie (Lord, Have Mercy), Gloria (Glory to God in the Highest), Credo (Nicene Creed), Sanctus (Holy) and Agnus Dei (Lamb of God). The hymns are in Latin, except for Kyrie, which is in Greek."

Education

There are 31 educational institutions in Mabalacat: one state college, one private college, one technical training school, two secondary public, two private high schools and 25 public elementary schools divided into two districts, Mabalacat North and Mabalacat South. Technical Education and Skills Development Authority (TESDA) accredited institutions offering vocational-technical skills abound in the area.

State University
The University of the Philippines - Diliman Extension Program in Pampanga (Clark) is located in a portion of Clark Freeport Zone that is located in Mabalacat City. It offers undergraduate courses such as BA Applied Psychology, BA Business Economics and BS Business Management. It also offers a non-thesis graduate course, Master in Management (MM) (University of the Philippines Diliman - Extension Program in Pampanga, 2020).

Private schools

Private schools in Mabalacat listed with the Department of Education are Livingstone International School, Athena's Cradle Center, Inc., Brightstone Learning Center, Children of Fatima School, Inc., Christian Vision Academy Madapdap, Dee Hwa Liong College Foundation, Don Bosco Academy Pampanga (originally from Bacolor; moved to Mabalacat after lahar struck the old campus), Don Teodoro V. Santos Institute, Doña Asuncion Lee Integrated School, Great Shepherd Christian Academy, Immanuel Montessori School, Inc., Clark College of Science and Technology, Jose C. Feliciano College, Mabalacat Christian Academy, Mary Help of Christians School, Inc., Montessori School of St. Nicholas, Nehemiah Christian School, Inc., School of the Infant Jesus the Empowered Zone for Excellence in Education, Inc. Dau, Shield of Victory Christian School, St. Anthony College of Technology, St. Mutien College, and Divine Grace Academy, FDSA Aviation College of Science and Technology Inc.

Listed with and accredited by TESDA is the Asian Institute of Computer Studies (AICS), a private technical school offering I.T. courses.

Gallery

References

External links

 [ Philippine Standard Geographic Code]
Philippine Census Information
Local Governance Performance Management System

 
Cities in Pampanga
Populated places established in 1712
1712 establishments in the Philippines
Component cities in the Philippines